The Winchester Repeating Arms Company Historic District is a historic district in New Haven, Connecticut that was listed on the National Register of Historic Places in 1988.  It includes 867 properties, which "include 858 major structures and 131 notable outbuildings."  Of these structures, 876 are buildings deemed to contribute to the historical and/or architectural significance of the area, and most of these are residential.  However the center of the district is "dominated" by the  tract of the former Winchester Repeating Arms Company, which contains industrial buildings.

The district includes and surrounds the old Winchester plant later run by U.S. Repeating Arms; the plant was important to both of its adjoining residential neighborhoods.  Some of the plant has been operated by Science Park at Yale, a business incubator with Yale University associations.

Significance
According to the district's 1987 nomination document:The district is historically significant for two reasons.  First its core encompasses the extensive surviving portions of the industrial complex developed by the former Winchester Repeating Arms Company, one of the nation's foremost late 19th- and early 20th-century armament manufacturers.  Second, the district as a whole forms New Haven's most nearly intact and cohesive surviving example of the inherent relationship between the growth of modern industry and the emergence of large working-class residential neighborhoods, a relationship typically associated with the development of many of the nation's northeastern urban communities during the late 19th and early 20th centuries (Criterion A).  The district is architecturally significant for three reasons.  First, its core embraces numerous examples of period industrial structures.  Second, the majority of these structures were built for the Winchester Repeating Arms Company according to designs provided by Leoni W. Robinson, one of New Haven's premier late 19/early 20th-century architects.  Finally, the district's predominantly residential perimeter areas encompass a host of relatively intact single- and multi-family workers' houses as well as several significant examples of commercial, religious, and municipal buildings dating from this same era.  As a group, these perimeter-area buildings represent a variety of important and popular vernacular architectural styles of the era, including late Greek Revival, Italianate, Gothic Revival, Queen Anne and Colonial Revival (Criterion C).

Residential development
Residential development in the district included development of tenement buildings for one, two or three families. Examples are as depicted in accompanying photo 2 (134-36, 138-40, 142-44, 146-48 Mansfield St.), photo 4 (166-68, 162-64, 156-58, 152-54, 146-48 Sheffield St., photo 5 (220-30 Division St.), photo 13 (567 Dixwell Ave.), photo 16 (552-54, 558 Winchester Ave.) and photo 20 (368, 370, 374, 378 Dixwell Ave.).
Two speculators who were very successful with such residential development were Joseph Sheldon and John W. Bishop: "these men were the moving force behind the 19th-century development of virtually all of the properties which currently line both sides of Admiral and most of Henry Streets, as well as the construction of most of the houses along the southwestern side of Munson Street directly opposite the Winchester complex.
Their work is depicted in accompanying photo 22 (51, 49, 43, 41, 39 Henry St.), photo 12 (49, 53, 55, 59 Admiral St.) and accompanying photo 9 (206, 208, 210, 212, 214, 216, 218, and 220-22 Munson St.).

Industrial development
The Winchester firm had started operations on Union Street in the Wooster Square neighborhood of New Haven, and moved to Bridgeport in 1866.  It relocated from Bridgeport to New Haven in 1870, to the current location in the district.  The original buildings which it built no longer exist. The firm grew to more than 600 employees by 1887 and "well in excess of 1,000" by the early 1900s.

Streets
Streets in the district include:
Mansfield Street
Accompanying photo 1 depicts houses at 72, 76, 82 Mansfield St.
Accompanying photo 2 depicts 134-36, 138-40, 142-44, 146-48 Mansfield St.
Accompanying photo 3 depicts 182, 184 Mansfield St.
Sheffield Street
Accompanying photo 4 depicts 166-68, 162-64, 156-58, 152-54, 146-48 Sheffield St.
Accompanying photo 6 depicts the Shelton Avenue School, at 155 Sheffield St.
Division Street
Accompanying photo 5 depicts 220-30 Division St.
Winchester Avenue
Accompanying photos 7, 8, 24, 25, 26, 27 and 28 depict the Winchester Repeating Arms Company complex, at 275 Winchester Ave., with some other properties also in view in some of the photos
Accompanying photo 16 depicts 552-54, 558 Winchester Ave.
Accompanying photo 23 depicts the McKesson and Robbins factory building, at 182 Winchester Ave.
Munson Street
Accompanying photo 9 depicts 206, 208, 210, 212, 214, 216, 218, 220-22 Munson St.
Thompson Street
Accompanying photo 10 depicts Newhall's Boarding House, built in 1860, at 55-57 Thompson St.
Ivy Street
Accompanying photo 11 depicts the Ivy Street School, at 1-41 Ivy St.
Admiral Street
Accompanying photo 12 depicts 49, 53, 55, 59 Admiral St.
Dixwell Avenue
Accompanying photo 13 depicts 567 Dixwell Ave.
Accompanying photo 14 depicts 495 Dixwell Ave.
Accompanying photo 17 depicts 459 Dixwell Ave., with decorative bargeboard
Accompanying photo 20 depicts 368, 370, 374, 378 Dixwell Ave.
Accompanying photo 21 depicts 287-89, 297-301 Dixwell Ave.
Shelton Avenue
Accompanying photo 15 depicts 140 Shelton Ave.
Accompanying photo 19 depicts 7-11, 13-15 Shelton Ave.
Newhall Street
Accompanying photo 18 depicts 141, 145-47 Newhall St.
Henry Street
Accompanying photo 22 depicts 51, 49, 43, 41, 39 Henry St.

Relationship to neighborhoods
The district is located in the Newhallville and Dixwell neighborhoods defined by the city of New Haven, Connecticut.

The 1987 NRHP nomination document reads:  the "255-acre district includes most of the southern and northern portions of the city's Newhallville and Dixwell neighborhoods, respectively."

Gallery

See also
Winchester Repeating Arms Company
U.S. Repeating Arms Company
Dixwell (neighborhood)
Newhallville (neighborhood)
National Register of Historic Places listings in New Haven, Connecticut

References

External links

Winchester Repeating Arms Company Historic District, New Haven Preservation Trust website (text excerpt from NRHP nomination)

Queen Anne architecture in Connecticut
Colonial Revival architecture in Connecticut
Italianate architecture in Connecticut
Historic districts in New Haven, Connecticut
National Register of Historic Places in New Haven, Connecticut
Historic districts on the National Register of Historic Places in Connecticut